Courtney Gum (born 25 September 1981) is a retired Australian rules footballer who most recently played for the Adelaide Football Club in the AFL Women's competition (AFLW). She previously played two seasons with the  before announcing a retirement in 2019, then reneging to reenter the AFLW draft later that same year.

After winning best and fairest in the inaugural season of the SANFL Statewide Super Women's League, Gum was drafted by Greater Western Sydney with their third selection and twenty-fifth overall in the 2017 AFL Women's draft. For her outstanding season she was named the AFL Players Association's Most Valuable Player in 2018.

Gum announced her retirement in March at the end of the 2019 season.

Gum lives with her partner Krissie Steen and son Buz.

References

External links 

1981 births
Living people
Greater Western Sydney Giants (AFLW) players
Australian rules footballers from South Australia
All-Australians (AFL Women's)
Adelaide Football Club (AFLW) players
Lesbian sportswomen
Australian LGBT sportspeople
LGBT players of Australian rules football
21st-century LGBT people